The Empire Award for Best Female Newcomer is an Empire Award presented annually by the British film magazine Empire to honour an actress who has delivered a breakthrough performance while working within the film industry. The Empire Award for Best Female Newcomer is one of two ongoing awards which were first introduced at the 17th Empire Awards ceremony in 2012 (along with Best Male Newcomer) with Felicity Jones receiving the award for her role in Like Crazy. Dafne Keen is the most recent winner in this category for her role in Logan. Winners are voted by the readers of Empire magazine.

Winners and nominees
In the list below, winners are listed first in boldface, followed by the other nominees. The number of the ceremony (1st, 2nd, etc.) appears in parentheses after the awards year, linked to the article (if any) on that ceremony.

2010s

References

External links

Actress
Film awards for debut actress